Hugh (or Hugo) de Roxburgh (or Hugo Cancellarius) was a late 12th century Chancellor of Scotland and bishop of Glasgow. He was rector of Tullibody and later Archdeacon of St. Andrews. He was elected to the see soon after the death of his predecessor Jocelin. However, it is probable that he was not consecrated, because he died on 10 July 1199, less than four months after his election. He was buried at Jedburgh Abbey.

References 

 Anderson, Alan Orr, Early Sources of Scottish History: AD 500–1286, 2 Vols, (Edinburgh, 1922), vol. ii, p. 305
 Dowden, John, The Bishops of Scotland, ed. J. Maitland Thomson, (Glasgow, 1912), pp. 299–300

1199 deaths
12th-century births
Bishops of Glasgow
Lord chancellors of Scotland
People from the Scottish Borders
12th-century Scottish Roman Catholic bishops